Wilson County Courthouse may refer to:

Wilson County Courthouse (Kansas), Fredonia, Kansas
Wilson County Courthouse (North Carolina), Wilson, North Carolina
Wilson County Courthouse and Jail, Floresville, Texas